The 1985 Tel Aviv Open was a men's tennis tournament played on outdoor hard courts that was part of the 1985 Nabisco Grand Prix. It was the sixth edition of the tournament and was played at the Israel Tennis Centers in the Tel Aviv District city of Ramat HaSharon, Israel from October 14 through October 21, 1985. First-seeded Brad Gilbert won the singles title.

Finals

Singles

 Brad Gilbert defeated  Amos Mansdorf 6–3, 6–2
 It was Gilbert's 3rd title of the year and the 6th of his career.

Doubles

 Brad Gilbert /  Ilie Năstase defeated  Michael Robertson /  Florin Segărceanu 6–3, 6–2
 It was Gilbert's 3rd title of the year and the 6th of his career. It was Nastase's only title of the year and the 102nd of his career.

References

 
Tel Aviv Open
Tel Aviv Open
Tel Aviv Open